
Lago della Sella is a reservoir near St. Gotthard Pass in the canton of Ticino, Switzerland. The gravity dam with a height of 36 m was completed in 1947.

The dam was planned and built under control of the Swiss engineer Fritz Gigax.

See also
List of lakes of Switzerland
List of mountain lakes of Switzerland

External links
Swissdams: Sella

Lakes of Ticino
Reservoirs in Switzerland